Subramaniam Santosh, popularly known as S.Santosh is an Indian cricketer, who has played in 30 first-class matches between 1983 and 1992.He also played a World Cup warm up match representing South Zone aganist Australia in 1987. Santosh, an allrounder, was a prominent player of 80's Kerala cricket team and he, along with his cricketer brothers S.Ramesh and S.Rajesh, played an integral role in making Kerala team, a notable one of South India in 1980's.

References

External links
 

1962 births
Living people
Kerala cricketers
Indian cricketers
South Zone cricketers
Cricketers from Thiruvananthapuram